Dark Reign may refer to:

Games 
Dark Reign: The Future of War, a 1997 real-time strategy game
Dark Reign 2, a 2000 real-time strategy game and prequel to the 1997 game

Comics 

 Dark Reign (comics), a 2008–2009 Marvel Comics storyline

See also 
 "Dark Rain", a 1997 episode of the TV series The Outer Limits